Arabicodium is a genus of green algae in the family Codiaceae.

References

External links

Ulvophyceae genera
Bryopsidales